Treaty of Purandar may refer to:

Treaty of Purandar (1665), between Jai Singh I and Shivaji 
Treaty of Purandar (1776), between the Peshwa of the Maratha Empire and the British East India Company